Reynolds is an unincorporated community in western Reynolds County, Missouri, United States. It is located at the intersection of Route 72 and Missouri Route B  approximately six miles southwest of Centerville.

A variant name was "Tralaloo". A post office called Tralaloo was established in 1904, and the name was changed to Reynolds in 1905. The present name is after Reynolds County.

References

Unincorporated communities in Reynolds County, Missouri
Unincorporated communities in Missouri